The Lisbon Formation is a geologic formation in the U.S. state of Georgia. It is predominantly sandstone deposited during the Paleogene Period.

See also

 List of fossiliferous stratigraphic units in Georgia (U.S. state)
 Paleontology in Georgia (U.S. state)

References

Paleogene Mississippi
Paleogene Georgia (U.S. state)
Paleogene Louisiana